Atlantis University is a private for-profit university in Miami. It offers degree programs through its schools of Information Technology, Engineering, Business, Health Care, and Foreign Languages. The university offers graduate, undergraduate, diploma and certification courses both onsite and online.

References

External links
 Official website

Private universities and colleges in Florida
Education in Miami